Shiji Niangniang is a goddess in Chinese religion and Taoism. Before becoming goddess, she was a 10,000-year-old demoness. It was originally a stone and was born outside the heavens and the earth, during the Chaos era and the Xuanhuang era.

Shiji was originally a major villain from the mythical classic Compendium of Information on the Gods of the Three Religions (三教搜神大全), and featured in the Chinese novel Fengshen Yanyi as a major antagonist of Nezha.

Legends
Chinese legend states that Shiji was originally a natural stone that received the essence of the sun and the moon. Shiji is said to have been born beyond the cosmos and became a divine spirit by undergoing the conditions of earth, water, fire and air. After 10,000 years of cultivation, this stubborn stone is said to have finally become a human figure by spiritual processes.

Shiji was later accepted by the heavenly master Tongtian Jiaozhu as a student. After attaining Taoism, it still took thousands of years to practice. Although the speed of her practice was very slow, because of countless years of efforts, Shiji developed a profound understanding of Tao. As far as her comprehensive strength is concerned, it is still above Taiyi Zhenren.

Compendium of Information on the Gods of the Three Religions
Shiji is a demon leader who is detrimental to the world and opposes heaven. She gave birth to the monsters and demons because the world was flooded, so the Jade Emperor was furious. The Jade Emperor ordered Nezha down to earth as an incarnate demon slayer. One day, Nezha used the bow and arrow of Rulai to shoot and kill Shiji's children, and finally Shiji was also killed with a magic pestle (魔杵).

Fengshen Yanyi
Shiji lives in the White Bone Cave of Skull Mountain, and she had two apprentices under the gate, namely, Biyun Tongzi and Caiyun Tonger. One day, Nezha shot an arrow and unintentionally killed the gatekeeper Biyun Tongzi. Shiji came to seek revenge for the death of Biyun Tongzi by killing Nezha and his father Li Jing. Nezha could not beat Shiji and his master Taiyi Zhenren came to protect him. Taiyi attacked Shiji and burned her with Nine-dragon-fire-net (九龍神火罩). While trapped in this net, Taiyi summoned several dragons which unleashed a large volley of fire into the net; instantly killing Shiji and turning her back into her original form as a molten rock. After her death, Jiang Ziya deified Shiji as the Yue Youxingjun (月遊星君 "Star of Moon Tour").

Overview
Shiji, although on the side of law and order, is depicted as rigid and lacking compassion. Moreover, although divine, both Ao Guang and Shiji are demonic figures in the Fengshen Yanyi. Nezha's crimes against them are accidental, and he defends himself—albeit excessively—from their aggressive attempts to punish him. In line with preceding argument, one might also view these circumstances as contributing to the author's careful construction of a sympathy path for Nezha.

Shiji is also related to the stones born from the heaven and earth of Sun Wukong or Jia Baoyu.

Religion
Shiji is worshipped in Chinese folk religion and is called "Shiji Niangniang" (the goddess of stone) or "Yue Youxingjun" (the deity of moon tour star).

Located in Caishiji, five miles southwest of Ma'anshan City, the Sanyuan Cave Temple (三元洞) is built with a sitting statue of Shiji.

References

Chinese goddesses
Deities in Taoism
Investiture of the Gods characters